The 2021–22 Djibouti Premier League was the 34th season of the Djibouti Premier League, the top-tier football league in Djibouti. The season began on 22 October 2021 and ended on 23 April 2022. The 20,000-capacity El Hadj Hassan Gouled Aptidon Stadium is the main venue of the league.

Arta/Solar7, captained by former FC Barcelona midfielder Alex Song, won the league for the second consecutive season. The team's forward, Gabriel Dadzie, won the Golden Boot award, scoring 18 goals.

The two newly promoted teams, EAD/PK 12 and Arhiba FC, were both relegated. Arhiba lost every game while EAD / PK 12 finished 9th on goal difference after a 0–1 loss to FC Dikhil in their final match.

Standings

References

Football leagues in Djibouti
Premier League
Premier League
Djibouti